Fairplay is a populated place in Adams County, Pennsylvania, United States. It is located between the Gettysburg Battlefield and the Mason–Dixon line at the intersection of U.S. Route 15 and the Emmitsburg Road, near Marsh Creek, in Freedom Township.  Moritz' Tavern at the intersection was the site of General John F. Reynolds' headquarters the night before the Battle of Gettysburg.

References

Unincorporated communities in Adams County, Pennsylvania
One-room schoolhouses in Pennsylvania

Unincorporated communities in Pennsylvania